The Ivanhoe (Warakirri) Correctional Centre, an Australian minimum security prison for males, is located in Ivanhoe, New South Wales. The centre is operated by Corrective Services NSW an agency of the Department of Attorney General and Justice of the Government of New South Wales. The centre detains sentenced and unsentenced felons under New South Wales and/or Commonwealth legislation.

The majority of inmates are Aboriginal. The centre detains up to 55 prisoners who perform cleaning and maintenance tasks, as well as participating in community projects and the mobile outreach program. Inmates may also undertake education programs, including numeracy and literacy, and self-awareness and alcohol- and substance-abuse management programs.

See also

Punishment in Australia

References

Prisons in New South Wales